Willem Mandigers (born 4 June 1989) is a Dutch professional darts player who competes in World Darts Federation events.

Career
Mandigers won the Turkish Open in 2014. At the 2014 World Masters he lost to Robbie Green in the first round 3–1. He qualified for the 2015 BDO World Darts Championship through the WDF regional qualifiers, he played Daniel Larsson in the Preliminary round and lost 3–1 in sets. He lost to Martin Phillips in the first round of the 2015 BDO World Trophy 6–3. At the 2015 World Masters he lost to Mark McGeeney in the first round 3–0. He qualified for the 2016 BDO World Darts Championship and lost to eventual champion Scott Waites in the first round. He was defeated by Krzysztof Ratajski in the preliminary round in 2017, but after a good season in which Mandigers once again won a tournament in Turkey, he won his first game at Lakeside in 2018 with a 3-0 win over Nick Kenny to reach the last 16.

World Championship results

BDO

 2015: Preliminary Round (lost to Daniel Larsson 1–3)
 2016: 1st Round (lost to Scott Waites 0–3)
 2017: Preliminary Round (lost to Krzysztof Ratajski 2–3)
 2018: 2nd Round (lost to Wayne Warren 2–4)
 2019: Quarter Final (lost to Michael Unterbuchner 4–5)
 2020: 1st Round (lost to Michael Unterbuchner 1–3)

Performance timeline

References

External links
Willem Mandigers at dartsdatabase.co.uk

1989 births
Living people
Dutch darts players
British Darts Organisation players
Sportspeople from Eindhoven